The Battle of Horreum Margi was fought between the Ostrogothic Kingdom and the Eastern Roman Empire in 505. The battle took place as the Ostrogothic Kingdom was expanding into the Balkans, eventually encroaching upon Eastern Roman territory. In this endeavor they were led by the general Pitzias and had allied themselves with the Hunnic-Gepidic robber-chieftain Mundo. As a response, the Eastern Roman Empire sent Sabinianus with a large force of Bulgars. At Horreum Margi, modern-day Ćuprija, Serbia, Sabinuanus was defeated.

Sources
 
 

505
Battles involving the Byzantine Empire
Battles involving the Huns
Battles involving the Ostrogoths
Military history of Serbia